Ben C. Solomon (born 1987) is an American filmmaker and journalist. He is currently an international correspondent for VICE News. He was the inaugural filmmaker-in-residence at Frontline after spending nine years as a foreign correspondent and video journalist for The New York Times. In 2015, Solomon won a Pulitzer Prize as part of a team of Times reporters working in Sierra Leone, Liberia and Guinea during the Ebola virus epidemic in West Africa. He has reported from over 60 countries including numerous war zones, including Syria, Iraq, Libya and Ukraine.

Early life and education 
Solomon graduated from Ladue Horton Watkins High School in 2006. Solomon attended DePauw University, where he majored in communications and minored in studio art. After graduating in 2010, Solomon started as an intern at The New York Times. When the Arab Spring broke out, he moved to Cairo, where he worked as a freelancer for two years.

Selected awards 
2022: Prix Bayeux Grand Format Television Trophy: 2nd Place "The Fall of Kandahar"
2022: News & Documentary Emmy Award Best News Coverage: Long Form, "Return of the Taliban"
2022: News & Documentary Emmy Award Video Journalism, "Return of the Taliban"
2019: News & Documentary Emmy Award Video Journalism, "Ebola in Congo"
2016: Cannes Lions Grand Prix, "The Displaced"
2016: World Press Photo, First prize, Innovative Storytelling, "The Displaced"
2016: Edward R. Murrow Award, Breaking News (Video), "Paris coverage"
2016: Overseas Press Club Awards, David Kaplan Award, "Paris"
2015: Pulitzer Prize for International Reporting
2015: World Press Photo, Multimedia 2nd prize, "Ebola Ambulance"
2015: Edward R. Murrow Award, Continuing Coverage (Video), "The Ebola Crisis"
2014: George Polk Award, Health Reporting
2013: POYi Multimedia Photographer of the year, 3rd place

References 

1987 births
Living people
Ladue Horton Watkins High School alumni
DePauw University alumni
The New York Times writers